WEZY may mean:

 WEZY (FM), a radio station (105.7 FM) licensed to serve Chippewa Falls, Wisconsin, United States
 WAUN (AM), a radio station (1350 AM) licensed to serve Portage, Wisconsin, United States, which held the call sign WEZY from 2021 to 2022
 WPDR-LD, a low-power television station (channel 35) licensed to serve Tomah, Wisconsin, United States, which held the call sign WEZY-LP from 2015 to 2021
 WVTY, a radio station (92.1 FM) licensed to serve Racine, Wisconsin, United States, which held the call sign WEZY from 1995 to 2014
 WLLD, a radio station (94.1 FM) licensed to serve Lakeland, Florida, United States, which held the call sign WEZY-FM from 1988 to 1995
 WMMV, a radio station (1350 AM) licensed to serve Cocoa, Florida, United States, which held the call sign WEZY from 1957 to 1978 and 1982 to 1988
 WLRQ-FM, a radio station (99.3 FM) licensed to serve Cocoa, Florida, United States, which held the call signs WEZY-FM and WEZY from 1965 to 1988